Dennis Herring is an American record producer, engineer, mixer, and musician. Herring has produced for The Hives, Elvis Costello, Counting Crows, Modest Mouse, Camper Van Beethoven, and Jars of Clay. The producer owns a 24-track recording studio in Los Angeles named DTLA Recording. Herring has won two Grammy awards.

Selected work
 1986 - American Girls by American Girls
 1988 - Our Beloved Revolutionary Sweetheart by Camper Van Beethoven
 1989 - Key Lime Pie by Camper Van Beethoven
 1991 - The Real Ramona by Throwing Muses
 1995 - Glow by The Innocence Mission
 1996 - See the Ocean Blue by The Ocean Blue
 1999 - This Desert Life by Counting Crows
 1999 - If I Left the Zoo by Jars of Clay (Note: Won Grammy Award for Best Pop/Contemporary Gospel Album)
 2001 - Sweet Tea by Buddy Guy
 2003 - Blues Singer by Buddy Guy
 2004 - Good News for People Who Love Bad News by Modest Mouse
 2004 - The Delivery Man by Elvis Costello and The Imposters
 2005 - End of Fashion by End of Fashion
 2007 - We Were Dead Before the Ship Even Sank by Modest Mouse
 2007 - The Black and White Album by The Hives
 2008 - Way to Normal by Ben Folds
 2009 - Armistice by Mutemath
 2010 - King of the Beach by Wavves
 2010 - Isaac Russell by Isaac Russell
 2012 - Highlife by This Club
 2013 - Beta Love by Ra Ra Riot
 2013 - Cheap Souvenirs by Hey Monea!
 2015 - Black Cat by Never Shout Never
 2017 - Weddings & Funerals by The Kickback

References

External links
 DTLA Recording official website

Living people
Year of birth missing (living people)
American record producers
Grammy Award winners
Place of birth missing (living people)